Hakeem Ademola Odoffin (born 13 April 1998) is an English footballer who plays as a defender or defensive midfielder for Rotherham United.

Personal life
He is of Nigerian descent.

Career
Odoffin joined Reading as an under-15 in 2012, after being released by Tottenham Hotspur, and stayed there for two years before joining Barnet on a two-year scholarship in 2014. He made his debut for the Bees in the Herts Senior Cup against St. Margaretsbury on 26 November 2014. The following season he made his professional debut for Barnet on 5 December 2015, starting in an FA Cup second round tie at home to Newport County.

Odoffin made two appearances for the Bees before joining Wolves in January 2016 for an undisclosed fee. He joined Eastleigh on loan in December 2016 where he was sent off on his debut against Southport. He went on to make 21 appearances for the Spitfires that season.

He was released by Wolves at the end of the 2017–18 season, before joining Northampton Town on a two-year deal in July 2018.

On 30 January 2019, Odoffin signed for Scottish Premiership club Livingston.

On 31 July 2020, Odoffin moved to Hamilton Academical for an undisclosed fee, signing a one-year contract. He was used in both defence and midfield by Hamilton and in February 2021, it was reported he had made more interceptions than any other under-23 player in Europe. In March 2021, he signed a one-year contract extension with Hamilton.

In August 2021 he signed a three-year deal with Rotherham United. He made his debut in the first game of the 2021–22 season against Plymouth Argyle on 7 August 2021, coming on as a second half substitute.

Career statistics

References

External links

1998 births
Living people
English people of Nigerian descent
English footballers
Barnet F.C. players
Wolverhampton Wanderers F.C. players
Eastleigh F.C. players
Northampton Town F.C. players
Association football defenders
English Football League players
National League (English football) players
Black British sportspeople
Footballers from the London Borough of Barnet
Livingston F.C. players
Hamilton Academical F.C. players
Scottish Professional Football League players
Rotherham United F.C. players